KARC-LP is a radio station broadcasting an educational religious format on 96.3 FM out of Oroville, California. It is licensed by Calvary Chapel Oroville and it went on the air on July 15, 2015.

References

External links

Oroville, California
2015 establishments in California
Radio stations established in 2017
ARC-LP

ARC-LP